Michele Vietti (born 10 February 1954) is an Italian politician.

Life and career 
Born in Lanzo Torinese, Vietti graduated in Law from the University of Turin in 1977, and between 1978 and 1987 he worked at the first Chair of Civil Law, at the Faculty of Law of the University. 

His political activity began in 1990, when he was elected as a district counselor in Turin, and he held this position until 1997. First elected deputy in 2001 with the Center-Right coalition, in 2002 he joined the Christian Democratic Centre party. He has held government positions, as Secretary to the Ministry of Justice (in the second Berlusconi cabinet) and Undersecretary to the Ministry of Economy and Finance (third Berlusconi cabinet).  He was re-elected deputy in 2006 and the following year he was appointed deputy secretary of his national party. Re-elected in 2008 with Union of Christian and Centre Democrats, Vietti received the role of deputy chairman of his parliamentary group. 

From 2010 to 30 September 2014 Vietti was the vice president of the Superior Council of Magistracy.

References

1954 births 
Living people
People from Lanzo Torinese
Christian Democracy (Italy) politicians
Christian Democratic Centre politicians
Union of the Centre (2002) politicians
Deputies of Legislature XII of Italy
Deputies of Legislature XIV of Italy
Deputies of Legislature XV of Italy
Deputies of Legislature XVI of Italy
Politicians of Piedmont
University of Turin alumni
Academic staff of the University of Turin